This list summarizes women's association football players with 100 or more international appearances.

As of 22 February 2023, a total of 396 women have played 100 or more international matches for their respective nations. The all-time leader in senior caps, Kristine Lilly of the United States, had 354 caps and retired from international football on 6 January 2011.

The currently active most-capped women's international football player is Christine Sinclair of Canada, with 322 caps.

Three American players, Kristine Lilly, Carli Lloyd and Christie Pearce, and one from Canada, Christine Sinclair, have 300 or more caps. In total, 26 players — twelve of them American; three from Canada; two each from China, and Sweden; and one each from Brazil, Denmark, Germany, Italy, Japan,  Netherlands, and Scotland — have 200 or more caps.

FIFA criteria
FIFA recognises only matches played within the FIFA World Cup (including qualifying competitions), continental competitions (including qualifiers), friendly matches between senior national teams and Olympic final and qualifying matches played up to and including 1960 (with certain exceptions) as international "A" matches. This affects some players who were formerly included in FIFA's 'Century Club'. Therefore, the records established by the associations with regard to these players may differ from the FIFA Century Club.

As FIFA recognises the Great Britain women's Olympic football team, these appearances are included. FIFA does not recognise the Catalonia women's national football team, and so these appearances are not included.

Caps
The names of currently active players are in bold. 

.

Most women with 100 or more caps by country 
.

Most women with 100 or more caps by Confederations
.

See also 
 List of top international women's football goal scorers by country
 List of women's footballers with 100 or more international goals
 List of men's footballers with 50 or more international goals
 List of men's footballers with the most official appearances
 List of footballers with 500 or more goals

References

External links
FIFA Century Club (women) updated 9 February 2011

 
100 or more caps

100 or more caps
Association football player non-biographical articles